Richard Tilden Smith (1865 – 18 December 1929) was a British businessman who made a fortune in mining in New South Wales and Western Australia and also had significant business interests in Britain.

Tilden Smith commissioned the pioneering steel-framed Adelaide House for his National Metal and Chemical Bank company. He died at the House of Commons and left £409,190.

References

Further reading
 Ansell, Caroline J. (2012) Richard Tilden Smith: A Man of Vision. Brisbane: Caroline J. Ansell. 
 Ansell, Caroline J. (2016) Adelaide House London Bridge. Queensland: Caroline J. Ansell.

External links

1865 births
1929 deaths
British businesspeople